The 'b' Album is a collection of B-sides and rarities released in 1996 by the Canadian folk band Moxy Früvous. A sticker on the packaging warned, "Not the third album!" At first self-published by the band, it was rereleased later that year with a revised track order in Canada by Warner Music Canada, and in the United States by Bottom Line Records.

Track listing (Warner version)

 "I Love My Boss"
 "The Greatest Man in America" (live)
 "Johnny Saucep'n"
 "Ash Hash" (by Bob Snider)
 "Gord's Gold"
 "Big Fish"
 "Jenny Washington"
 "The Ballad of Cedric Früvous"
 "Entropy"
 "The Kids' Song" (live)

External links
Album information page at fruvous.com

Moxy Früvous albums
1996 EPs